Rostock, officially the Hanseatic and University City of Rostock, is the largest city in the German state of Mecklenburg-Vorpommern and lies in the Mecklenburgian part of the state, close to the border with Pomerania. With around 208,000 inhabitants, it is the third-largest city on the German Baltic coast after Kiel and Lübeck, the eighth-largest city in the area of former East Germany, as well as the 39th-largest city of Germany. Rostock was the largest coastal and most important port city in East Germany.

Rostock stands on the estuary of the River Warnow into the Bay of Mecklenburg of the Baltic Sea. The city stretches for about  along the river. The river flows into the sea in the very north of the city, between the boroughs of Warnemünde and Hohe Düne. The city center lies further upstream, in the very south of the city. Most of Rostock's inhabitants live on the western side of the Warnow; the area east of the river is dominated by the port, industrial estates, and the forested Rostock Heath. The city's coastline east and west of the river mouth is relatively undeveloped, with long sandy beaches prevailing. The name of the city is of Slavic origin.

Rostock is the economic center of Mecklenburg-Western Pomerania and the state's only regiopolis (a city outside the core of a metropolitan area). The port of Rostock is the fourth largest port in Germany after the North Sea ports of Hamburg, Bremen/Bremerhaven, and Wilhelmshaven, and the largest port on the German Baltic coast. The ferry routes between Rostock to Gedser in Denmark and to Trelleborg in Southern Sweden are among the busiest between Germany and Scandinavia. Rostock–Laage Airport lies in a rural region southeast of the city.

The city is home to the oldest university in the Baltic region and one of the oldest universities in the world, the University of Rostock, founded in 1419. The university's hospital, Universitätsmedizin Rostock, is one of two university hospitals in the state, along with Universitätsmedizin Greifswald of the University of Greifswald in Western Pomerania.

History

Early history

In the 11th century Polabian Slavs founded a settlement at the Warnow river called Roztoc (*ras-tokŭ, Slavic for "fork of a river"); the name Rostock is derived from that designation.

The Danish king Valdemar I set the town on fire in 1161. Afterwards the place was settled by German traders. Initially there were three separate cities:
 Altstadt (Old Town) around the Alter Markt (Old Market), which had St. Petri (St. Peter's Church),
 Mittelstadt (Middle Town) around the Neuer Markt (New Market), with St. Marien (St. Mary's Church) and

 Neustadt (New Town) around the Hopfenmarkt (Hop Market, now University Square), with St. Jakobi (St. James's Church, demolished after World War II).

In 1218, Rostock was granted Lübeck law city rights by Heinrich Borwin, prince of Mecklenburg.

Hanseatic League

During the first partition of Mecklenburg following the death of Henry Borwin II of Mecklenburg in 1226, Rostock became the seat of the Lordship of Rostock, which survived for almost a century. In 1251, the city became a member of the Hanseatic League. In the 14th century it was a powerful seaport town with 12,000 inhabitants and the largest city in Mecklenburg. Ships for cruising the Baltic Sea were constructed in Rostock. The formerly independent fishing village of Warnemünde at the Baltic Sea became a part of Rostock in 1323, to secure the city's access to the sea.

In 1419, the University of Rostock was founded, the oldest university in continental northern Europe and the Baltic Sea area.

15th to 18th centuries

At the end of the 15th century, the dukes of Mecklenburg succeeded in enforcing their rule over the town of Rostock, which had until then been only nominally subject to their rule and essentially independent. They took advantage of a riot known as Domfehde, a failed uprising of the impoverished population. Subsequent quarrels with the dukes and persistent plundering led ultimately to a loss of the city's economic and political power.

In 1565 there were further clashes with Schwerin that had far-reaching consequences. Among other things, the nobility introduced a beer excise that favoured the dukes. John Albert I advanced on the city with 500 horsemen, after Rostock had refused to take the formal oath of allegiance, and had the city wall razed (slighted) to have a fortress built. The conflict did not end until the first Rostock Inheritance Agreement of 21 September 1573, in which the state princes were guaranteed hereditary rule over the city for centuries and recognizing them as the supreme judicial authority; this bound Rostock for a long time. The citizens razed (or slighted) the fortress the following spring.

From 1575 to 1577 the city walls were rebuilt, as was the Lagebusch tower and the Stein Gate, in the Dutch Renaissance style. The inscription sit intra te concordia et publica felicitas ("You enter a state of harmony and happiness"), can still be read on the gate, and refers directly to the conflict with the Duke. In 1584 the Second Rostock Inheritance Agreement was enforced, which resulted in a further loss of former city tax privileges. At the same time, these inheritance contracts put paid to Rostock's ambition of achieving imperial immediacy, as Lübeck had done in 1226.

The strategic location of Rostock provoked the envy of its rivals. Danes and Swedes occupied the city twice, first during the Thirty Years' War (1618–48) and again from 1700 to 1721. Later in the early 19th century, the French, under Napoleon, occupied the town for about a decade until 1813. In nearby Lübeck-Ratekau, Gebhard Leberecht von Blücher, who was born in Rostock and who was one of few generals to fight on after defeat at the Battle of Jena, surrendered to the French in 1806. This was only after furious street fighting in the Battle of Lübeck, in which he led some of the cavalry charges himself. By the time of the surrender, the exhausted Prussians had neither food nor ammunition.

19th century

In the first half of the 19th century, Rostock regained much of its economic importance, due at first to the wheat trade, then, from the 1850s, to industry, especially its shipyards. The first propeller-driven steamers in Germany were constructed here.

The city grew in area and population, with new quarters developing in the south and west of the ancient borders of the city. Two notable developments were added to house the increasing population at around 1900:
 Steintor-Vorstadt in the south, stretching from the old city wall to the facilities of the new Lloydbahnhof (Lloyd Railway Station, now Rostock Hauptbahnhof), was designed as a living quarter. It consisted mostly of large single houses, once inhabited by wealthy citizens.
 Kröpeliner-Tor-Vorstadt in the west, was designed to house the working population as well as to provide smaller and larger industrial facilities, such as the Mahn & Ohlerich's Brewery (now Hanseatische Brauerei Rostock). The main shipyard, Neptun, was nearby at the shore of the river.

20th century
In the 20th century, important aircraft manufacturing facilities were situated in the city, such as the Arado Flugzeugwerke in Warnemünde and the Heinkel Works with facilities at various places, including their secondary Heinkel-Süd facility in Schwechat, Austria, as the original Heinkel firm's Rostock facilities had been renamed Heinkel-Nord. The world's first airworthy jet plane prototype made its test flights at their facilities in what used to be named the Rostock- neighborhood (today's Rostock-Schmarl community, along the west bank of the Unterwarnow estuary).

In the early 1930s the Nazi Party began to gain among Rostock's voters, many of whom had suffered economic hardship during the 1920s. In elections in the summer 1932, when the Nazis achieved 37.3 percent, their greatest national showing in a free election, they polled 40.3 percent in Rostock. A year later, after the Nazi seizure of power and the suppression of other political parties, the Rostock city council (Stadtrat) was composed entirely of Nazis. During Kristallnacht on 10 November 1938, the synagogue in Rostock's Augustenstrasse was destroyed by arson and dozens of Jews were beaten and imprisoned.

Feverish rearmament by the Nazi regime boosted Rostock's industrial importance in the late 1930s, and employment soared at the Heinkel and Arado factories, and at the Neptunwerft shipyard. The city's population grew from 100,000 in 1935 to 121,192 in 1939.

During World War II, Rostock was subjected to repeated and increasingly heavy bombing attacks, especially by the British Royal Air Force. Targets included the Heinkel and Arado plants and the shipyard, but churches and other historic structures in the city centre were also heavily damaged, among them the 14th-century Nikolaikirche (St Nicholas Church) and Jakobikirche (St Jacob's Church). The ruins of the latter were torn down in 1960.

The city was eventually captured by the Soviet 2nd Belorussian Front on 2 May 1945 during the Stettin-Rostock offensive operation.

After the war, Rostock – now in the German Democratic Republic – became East Germany's largest seaport. The state expanded the national shipyards in the district of Warnemünde. The city's population, boosted in part by resettled ethnic German refugees who had been expelled from territories in the east, increased in the GDR years to a peak of 260,000. Following the reunification of Germany in 1990, Rostock lost its privileged position as the No. 1 port of the GDR, and the city's population declined to about 200,000. However, after 2006, the population increased again. Today, Rostock and Warnemünde are significant tourist destinations on the Baltic Sea.

Since the late 20th century migrants have come to Germany from Turkey and Africa seeking work. In response to high rates of joblessness and increased levels of crime, some Germans took part in the Rostock-Lichtenhagen riots which occurred from 22 to 24 August 1992.

Politics

Districts

Symbols

Rostock has had three different coats of arms, known as the Signum, the Secretum and the Sigillum. The Signum, which can be traced back to 1367, was developed last and is to this day the coat of arms of the city.

The Signum depicts a golden griffin on a blue background, with bars of silver and red, the colours of the Hanseatic League, below. It can be seen not only on flags and houses, and at bus stops, but also on bridges, gullies, fences, ships and restaurants.

Administration

Since the 13th century, the governing body of the city has been the city council (Rat), first consisting of ten, later of 24 elected aldermen (Ratsherren). The chairman of the city council was the city mayor. In the 19th century there were three mayors. Since 1925, the head of the city has borne the title of Lord Mayor. Having been elected by the city council for centuries, since 2002 this position is now elected directly by the citizens of Rostock, following a reform. If a candidate does not achieve an absolute majority in the first round, the two candidates with the most votes stand in a second round.

The current Lord Mayor of Rostock is Eva-Maria Kröger of The Left, who was elected mayor in 2022 and took office on 1 February 2023. She won in the second round with 58.4% of votes against senior police officer Michael Ebert, an independent backed by the Christian Democratic Union, Independent Citizens for Rostock, and Free Democratic Party.

The most recent mayoral election was held on 13 November 2022, with a runoff held on 27 November, and the results were as follows:

! rowspan=2 colspan=2| Candidate
! rowspan=2| Party
! colspan=2| First round
! colspan=2| Second round
|-
! Votes
! %
! Votes
! %
|-
| bgcolor=| 
| align=left| Eva-Maria Kröger
| align=left| The Left
| 18,885
| 25.3
| 36,546
| 58.4
|-
| bgcolor=| 
| align=left| Michael Ebert
| align=left| Independent (CDU/UFR/FDP)
| 17,598
| 23.6
| 26,082
| 41.6
|-
| bgcolor=| 
| align=left| Carmen-Alina Botezatu
| align=left| Social Democratic Party
| 12,339
| 16.5
|-
| bgcolor=| 
| align=left| Claudia Müller
| align=left| Alliance 90/The Greens
| 6,414
| 8.6
|-
| bgcolor=| 
| align=left| Michael Meister
| align=left| Alternative for Germany
| 4,812
| 6.5
|-
| bgcolor=| 
| align=left| Jörg Kibellus
| align=left| Independent
| 3,836
| 5.1
|-
| bgcolor=| 
| align=left| Jens Kaufmann
| align=left| Independent
| 3,007
| 4.0
|-
| bgcolor=| 
| align=left| Robert Uhde
| align=left| Independent
| 1,807
| 2.4
|-
| bgcolor=| 
| align=left| Karol Langnickel
| align=left| Independent
| 1,442
| 1.9
|-
| bgcolor=| 
| align=left| Holger Luckstein
| align=left| Independent
| 1,182
| 1.6
|-
| bgcolor=| 
| align=left| Niels Burmeister
| align=left| Independent
| 1,109
| 1.5
|-
| 
| align=left| Rebecca Thoß
| align=left| German Beer Drinkers Union
| 669
| 0.9
|-
| bgcolor=| 
| align=left| Niklas Zimathis
| align=left| Independent
| 453
| 0.6
|-
| bgcolor=| 
| align=left| Roland Ulrich
| align=left| Independent
| 369
| 0.5
|-
| bgcolor=| 
| align=left| Matthias Bräuer
| align=left| Independent
| 312
| 0.4
|-
| bgcolor=| 
| align=left| Kai Oppermann
| align=left| Independent
| 196
| 0.3
|-
| bgcolor=| 
| align=left| Alina Kreis
| align=left| Independent
| 155
| 0.2
|-
! colspan=3| Valid votes
! 71,585
! 99.4
! 62,628
! 99.1
|-
! colspan=3| Invalid votes
! 476
! 0.6
! 563
! 0.9
|-
! colspan=3| Total
! 75,061
! 100.0
! 63,191
! 100.0
|-
! colspan=3| Electorate/voter turnout
! 171,884
! 43.7
! 171,464
! 36.9
|-
| colspan=7| Source: City of Rostock (1st round, 2nd round)
|}

The city parliament (Bürgerschaft) represents the citizens. Representative are elected for five years. The number of representatives is currently 53. The city parliament is presided by the Präsident der Bürgerschaft, who heads and prepares the sessions and, together with the Lord Mayor, represents the city. The most recent city council election was held on 26 May 2019, and the results were as follows:

! colspan=2| Party
! Votes
! %
! +/-
! Seats
! +/-
|-
| bgcolor=| 
| align=left| The Left (Die Linke)
| 58,405
| 19.9
|  6.5
| 11
|  3
|-
| bgcolor=| 
| align=left| Alliance 90/The Greens (Grüne)
| 55,616
| 19.0
|  7.5
| 10
|  4
|-
| bgcolor=| 
| align=left| Christian Democratic Union (CDU)
| 42,422
| 14.5
|  6.0
| 8
|  3
|-
| bgcolor=| 
| align=left| Social Democratic Party (SPD)
| 42,269
| 14.4
|  2.5
| 8
|  1
|-
| bgcolor=| 
| align=left| Alternative for Germany (AfD)
| 28,294
| 9.6
|  5.2
| 5
|  3
|-
| 
| align=left| Independent Citizens for Rostock (UFR)
| 21,483
| 7.3
|  0.8
| 4
| ±0
|-
| 
| align=left| Rostock Alliance (RB)
| 12,086
| 4.1
|  0.5
| 2
|  1
|-
| bgcolor=| 
| align=left| Free Democratic Party (FDP)
| 9,645
| 3.3
|  0.8
| 2
|  1
|-
| bgcolor=| 
| align=left| Die PARTEI (PARTEI)
| 7,373
| 2.5
| New
| 1
| New
|-
| bgcolor=| 
| align=left| Free Voters (FW)
| 3,790
| 1.3
| New
| 1
| New
|-
| 
| align=left| New Start 09 (A'09)
| 2,897
| 1.0
|  0.5
| 1
| ±0
|-
| colspan=7 bgcolor=lightgrey| 
|-
| bgcolor=| 
| align=left| The Grays – Gray Panthers (Graue)
| 1,869
| 0.6
|  0.1
| 0
|  1
|-
| bgcolor=| 
| align=left| Pirate Party Germany (Piraten)
| 1,714
| 0.6
| New
| 0
| New
|-
| bgcolor=| 
| align=left| National Democratic Party (NPD)
| 1,633
| 0.6
|  1.2
| 0
|  1
|-
| bgcolor=| 
| align=left| Independents
| 3,779
| 1.3
| 
| 0
| ±0
|-
! colspan=2| Valid votes
! 293,275
! 98.6
! 
! 
! 
|-
! colspan=2| Invalid votes
! 4,179
! 1.4
! 
! 
! 
|-
! colspan=2| Total
! 102,304
! 100.0
! 
! 53
! ±0
|-
! colspan=2| Electorate/voter turnout
! 173,650
! 58.9
!  18.4
! 
! 
|-
| colspan=7| Source: City of Rostock
|}

Regiopolis Rostock
Rostock is the first city region that defines itself not only as a city in its boundaries, but as a regiopolis, with a supra-regional sphere of influence. A regiopolis can be compared to a metropolis, but on a smaller scale. This is a sign for the inter-regional cooperation and economic dynamics that can be found in the Rostock area. A taskforce with different actors such as the hanseatic city of Rostock, the administrative district of Rostock, the Regional Planning Association Middle Mecklenburg/Rostock and the local business organisations are working on the promotion and advancement of the concept.

Geography

Geographic location
Rostock is located nearly centrally on Mecklenburg-Vorpommern's Baltic Sea coast. The city is crossed by the Warnow.

The west and the southeast are the most densely populated parts of town. The overseas port is to the east of Rostock.

Climate
Rostock has an oceanic climate (Köppen: Cfb) with strong influence of the Baltic Sea, more similar with Denmark and far southern Sweden than to the rest of Germany. The Warnemünde station is located on the open sea and thus has a stronger maritime influence and slightly smaller variations than the downtown that is further inland.

Main sights

Rostock

One of the most picturesque places in Rostock is the Neuer Markt (New Market Square), with the Town Hall – that was originally built in the 13th century in Brick Gothic style, but extensively transformed in the 18th century, with the addition of a Baroque façade and a banqueting hall. The square also preserved six original, carefully restored gable houses from the 15th and 16th centuries. The other historical houses in Hanseatic style that once bordered the square were destroyed in an Allied air-raid in 1942, and rebuilt in a simplified manner.

The 15th-century Kerkhofhaus (at Große Wasserstraße, behind the Town Hall) is considered the best-preserved brick Gothic house in Rostock. 

St. Mary's Church Marienkirche, on Ziegenmarkt, is an imposing Brick Gothic church. Built in the 13th century, it was enlarged and modified at the end of the 14th century into the present cross-shaped basilica. The huge tower was not completed until the end of the 18th century. Inside there is an astronomical clock erected in 1472 by Hans Düringer.

The main pedestrian precinct is Kröpeliner Straße, which runs east from the Neuer Markt to the 14th-century Kröpeliner Tor, a former town gate. The main buildings of Rostock University lie at Universitätsplatz, near the middle of the street, in front of the lively fountain of zest for life (Brunnen der Lebensfreude), known colloquially as Pornobrunn (fountain of pornography), for its nude sculptures.

The Kloster St Katharinen (Convent of St. Catherine), is an old Franciscan monastery founded in 1243, and extended several times during the 14th and 15th centuries. Now used as the seat of the Academy of Music and Theatre (HMT-Rostock).

The Brick Gothic Nikolaikirche (St. Nicholas Church), which is the oldest church in Rostock, was built in the mid-13th century. Heavily damaged during World War II and subsequently restored, the building is now used as an exhibition centre and concert hall, due to its outstanding acoustics.

Some parts of the medieval city wall, with four city gates, have survived to the present day.

Warnemünde

Warnemünde is the seaside part of Rostock and a major attraction of the city. Locals and tourists alike enjoy the maritime flair of old houses, a large beach, a lighthouse and the old fisherman's port.

Economy
The economy is mainly characterised by maritime industries (especially shipbuilding), high-tech industries (IT, biotechnology/life sciences, medical engineering), the University of Rostock, tourism and the service sector. Major companies include:

Maritime Industry
 Caterpillar Inc., manufacturer of diesel engines for ships
 Deutsche Seereederei Rostock, transport, cruises, property and tourism holding
 F. Laeisz
 Neptun Werft, shipyard belonging to Meyer Neptun Group
 Nordic Yards Warnemünde, shipyard 
 Schiffselektronik Rostock
 Tamsen Maritim shipyard

Other engineering
 Nordex SE, a major producer of wind turbines
 Suzlon, world's 5th largest wind turbine manufacturer
 Liebherr, manufacturer of cranes

Tourism industry
 AIDA Cruises, German company for cruises
 Scandlines, German-Danish ferry operator (by Scandferries Holding)

Others
 Hanseatische Brauerei Rostock, German brewery belonging to the Oetker-Gruppe
 Rostock University Hospital (Universitätsmedizin)
 Yara International, supplier of plant nutrients

Education

Rostock is home to one of the oldest universities in the world. Founded in 1419, the University of Rostock is the third oldest university in Germany in continuous operation, and one of the oldest universities of the world.
It also maintains a botanical garden, the Botanischer Garten Universität Rostock.

The Academy of Music and Theatre (Hochschule für Musik und Theater) offers graduate degrees in artistic fields. Founded in 1994, the institution combined Ernst Busch, the former drama school, and the outpost school of the Hanns Eisler Music School Berlin. Today, the combined school is a member of the Association of Baltic Academies of Music (ABAM), a union of 17 music conservatories at the Baltic Sea and Israel. Unique in Europe is the postgraduate degree in piano duo performance. The school possesses a large opera stage (Katharinensaal) and two chamber music halls. There are concerts every day throughout the year.

Rostock also hosts the Max Planck Institute for Demographic Research and the Leibniz Institute for Catalysis, as well as two branches of Fraunhofer Institutes, one for Computer Graphics and one for Large Structures in Production Technology.

Culture

Theatre
The municipal theatre is the Volkstheater Rostock where the Norddeutsche Philharmonie Rostock plays.

Events
The city is home to the annual Hanse Sail festival, during which many large sailing ships and museum vessels are brought out to sea, drawing over 1.5 million visitors.

An annual jazz festival, Ostsee-Jazz ("Baltic Sea Jazz"), takes place in June.

Cinemas
The Lichtspieltheater Wundervoll is the art house cinema of Rostock. It opened in 1993 and offers a daily programme in two venues, the Metropol and the Frieda 23 with three cinemas. At Frieda 23 is the Institut für neue Medien (IFNM), Rostock's Institute for New Media, which includes a media workshop.
Both Liwu and IFNM are active members of the Landesverband Filmkommunikation Mecklenburg-Vorpommern. Special screenings for schools, educational programmes and special programmes are offered as well.
It is the central venue for Rostock's Film Festival, the Festival im Stadthafen (FISH), the German Federal Festival for Young German Film.

Museums and zoo

 Rostock Art Gallery (Kunsthalle Rostock)
 Museum of Cultural History (Kulturhistorisches Museum)
 Stasi Museum (Dokumentations- und Gedenkstätte der Bundesbeauftragten für die Unterlagen des Staatssicherheitsdienstes der ehemaligen Deutschen Demokratischen Republik)
 Warnemünde Local History Museum (Heimatmuseum Warnemünde)
 Shipbuilding and Shipping Museum (Schiffbau- und Schifffahrtsmuseum)
 Rostock Zoo
 Walter Kempowski Archive
 Max-Samuel-Haus, Rostock Jewish Heritage Centre

Food and drink
Rostock manufactures its own local beer, called Rostocker Pilsner, manufactured at the Hanseatische Brauerei Rostock GmbH (Rostock Hanseatic Brewery Ltd.). The beer is well known throughout the city and is also sold in cities nearby. To celebrate Rostock's 800th birthday, a special light beer called Heller Freude was brewed to commemorate the occasion.

Sport

Transport

Car
Rostock can be reached by motorway (Autobahn) A 1 from Hamburg via Lübeck on A 20 and by A 19 from Berlin and A 20 from Stettin in Poland.

Public transport
Rostock Hauptbahnhof offers fast rail connections to Hamburg and Berlin and from there to almost any other European city.

Rostock is served by the Rostock tramway network, with six tram lines that serve the inner city as well as the suburbs. The city is also served by an extensive bus fleet, as well as a handful of ferries that cross the Warnow.

Ferry/ship
Rostock is Germany's largest Baltic port. Rostock is also home to a large ferry port. It is a main base for ferry operators Scandlines and TT-Line, which both connect Rostock with major Scandinavian destinations. Furthermore, Rostock receives the highest number of cruise tourists in Germany every year.

Ferries leave for
 Helsinki, Finland
 Gedser, Denmark
 Trelleborg, Sweden
 Nynäshamn, Sweden
 Visby, Sweden

Air
The Rostock–Laage Airport offers connections to major German and international destinations; regular flights to e.g. Munich are offered. The nearest larger international airports are in Hamburg and Berlin. There are also a number of airfields for smaller aircraft, such as Purkshof.

Twin towns - sister cities

Rostock is twinned with:
 Szczecin, Poland (1957)
 Turku, Finland (1959)
 Dunkirk, France (1960)
 Riga, Latvia (1961)
 Antwerp, Belgium (1963)
 Aarhus, Denmark (1964)
 Gothenburg, Sweden (1965)
 Bergen, Norway (1965)
 Rijeka, Croatia (1966)
 Varna, Bulgaria (1966)
 Bremen, Germany (1987)
 Dalian, China (1988)
 Raleigh, United States (2001)
 Guldborgsund, Denmark (2014)

Notable people

 Before 19th century
Henry Borwin I (–1227), Lord of Mecklenburg
Tycho Brahe (1546–1601), Danish astronomer.
Simon Paulli (1603–1680), Danish physician and naturalist
Franz Aepinus (1724–1802), German-Russian natural philosopher.
Johann Heinrich Bartholomäus Walter (1734–1802), Baltic-German architect, working in Tartu
Gebhard Leberecht von Blücher (1742–1819), Prussian field marshal.
Matthias Christian Sprengel (1746–1803), geographer and historian
Christian Martin Frähn (1782–1851), German-Russian numismatist and historian.

 19th century
John Brinckman (1814–1870), poet and short story writer
Moritz Wiggers (1816–1894), politician, lawyer and notary
Paul Tischbein (1820–1874), illustrator and painter primarily of landscapes
Ferdinand von Mueller (1825–1896), German-Australian physician, geographer and botanist.
Johann Georg Noel Dragendorff (1836–1898), pharmacist and chemist
Adolf Wilbrandt (1837–1911), a German novelist and dramatist.
Rudolph Sohm (1841–1917), jurist, Church historian and theologian
Hermann von Maltzan (1843–1891), malacologist known for his work in the field of conchology
Albrecht Kossel (1853–1927), biochemist and pioneer in genetics, recipient of 1910 Nobel Prize in Physiology or Medicine for determining the chemical composition of nucleic acids
Mathilde Mann (1859–1925), prominent German translator and editor
Paul Walden (1863–1957), Latvian-German chemist
Edvard Munch (1863–1944), Norwegian painter.
Gustav Mie (1868–1957), physicist, worked on electromagnetic waves
Carl Brockelmann (1868–1956), Semiticist and orientalist
Heinrich Tessenow (1876–1950), architect, professor and urban planner
Paul Wallat (1879–1964), landscape artist, draftsman and sculptor
Hans Paasche (1881–1920), politician and pacifist
Margarete Scheel (1881–1969), artist, specializing in sculpture and ceramics
Ernst Heinkel (1888–1958), aviation pioneer
Karl Leo Heinrich Lehmann (1894–1960), American art historian, archaeologist and professor
Arthur R. von Hippel (1898–2003), German-American materials scientist and physicist

 20th century
Walter Hallstein (1901–1982), diplomat and politician, wrote the Hallstein Doctrine
Erika Fuchs (1906–2005), translator
Marianne Hoppe (1909–2002), actress
Hans von Ohain (1911–1998), physicist and engineer
Duchess Woizlawa Feodora of Mecklenburg (1918–2019), member of the House of Mecklenburg-Schwerin
Berndt von Staden (1919–2014), diplomat, Ambassador to the United States 1973–1979
Peter Borgelt (1927–1994), actor
Walter Kempowski (1929–2007), writer
Peter Schulz (1930–2013), politician (SPD) and first Mayor of Hamburg 1971–1974
Egbert Brieskorn (1936–2013), mathematician who introduced Brieskorn spheres
Klaus Kilimann (born 1938), physicist, politician (SPD) and Mayor of Rostock 1990–1993
Joachim Gauck (born 1940), politician, civil rights activist and President of Germany 2012–2017
Sibylle Günter (born 1964), theoretical physicist
Heinz Eggert (born 1946), theologian and CDU politician
Franziska Knuppe (born 1974), fashion model
Hinnerk Schönemann (born 1974), actor
Marteria (born 1982), hip hop artist

 Sport
Friedrich Wilhelm Rahe (1888–1949), tennis and field hockey player
Jan Ullrich (born 1973), cyclist, Tour de France winner and Olympic medalist
Britta Kamrau (born 1979), long-distance swimmer
André Greipel (born 1982), road bicycle racer
Paul Martens (born 1983), road bicycle racer
Stephan Krüger (born 1988), rower

Notes

References

Bibliography

See also
Music in Rostock

External links

 
Official tourism site
European Route of Brick Gothic: Rostock
 

 
Cities and towns in Mecklenburg
Denmark–Germany border crossings
Members of the Hanseatic League
Port cities and towns in Germany
Port cities and towns of the Baltic Sea
Populated coastal places in Germany (Baltic Sea)
1218 establishments in Europe
Populated places established in the 11th century
Grand Duchy of Mecklenburg-Schwerin
Holocaust locations in Germany